Temir Agrembaevich Sariyev (born 17 June 1963) is a Kyrgyz politician who was Prime Minister of Kyrgyzstan from 2015 to 2016. He was a presidential candidate for the 2009 elections, receiving 157,005 (6.74%) votes. Sariyev was a candidate in the country's 2017 presidential elections, in which he garnered 2.54% of the vote (42,910 votes) and came in fourth place.

Early career

Sariyev was born on June 17, 1963 in the village of Tösh-Bulak, Sokuluk District,  Chuy Region. He graduated from a sports boarding school in Bishkek at the age of 17. From 1981 to 1983, he served in the Soviet Army. After that, he worked at the Alamedinskaya fur factory, first as a freight forwarder, then as an economist and a senior economist. In 1987, he got a job at the department of working youth of the Alamedin District Committee, working first as an instructor, and two years later, he became the head of the department. He was engaged in party work in the Alamedin district committee until 1991.

References

|-

1963 births
Finance ministers of Kyrgyzstan
Economy ministers of Kyrgyzstan
Living people
Prime Ministers of Kyrgyzstan
People from Chüy Region
Communist Party of the Soviet Union members